Environment of Côte d'Ivoire

The Ivory Coast has more than 1,200 animal species—223 mammal, 702 bird, 125 reptile, 38 amphibian, and 111 fish species—and 4,700 plant species. It is the most biodiverse country in West Africa, but unlike other countries there, its diversity isn't concentrated along the coast, but rather in the rugged interior.

Protected areas

 Assagny National Park
 Banco National Park
 Comoé National Park
 Îles Ehotilés National Park
 Marahoué National Park
 Mont Nimba National Park
 Mont Péko National Park
 Mont Sângbé National Park
 Taï National Park

Treaties and international agreements

Côte d'Ivoire is party to the following treaties:
Convention on Biological Diversity 
United Nations Framework Convention on Climate Change
United Nations Convention to Combat Desertification
Convention on the International Trade in Endangered Species of Wild Flora and Fauna
Basel Convention on hazardous wastes
United Nations Convention on the Law of the Sea
Convention on the Prevention of Marine Pollution by Dumping of Wastes and Other Matter 
Comprehensive Test Ban Treaty on nuclear testing
Montreal Protocol on ozone depletion 
MARPOL 73/78 on ship pollution
International Tropical Timber Agreement, 1983
International Tropical Timber Agreement, 1994
Ramsar Convention on wetland conservation

Environmental issues

Historic
The 2006 Côte d'Ivoire toxic waste dump was a health crisis in which Trafigura illegally dumped toxic waste in up to 12 sites around Abidjan in August 2006.

Current
Palm oil is one of the commodities exported by Côte d'Ivoire and the plantations have an environmental impact. Palmci, the main palm oil company, said that environmentalists had caused it to abandon plans for a palm oil plantation in the Tanoe forest wetlands.

Ivory Coast had a 2018 Forest Landscape Integrity Index mean score of 3.64/10, ranking it 143rd globally out of 172 countries.

See also
List of environmental issues

References